Chupino is a rural locality (a settlement) in Voykovsky Selsoviet, Shipunovsky District, Altai Krai, Russia. The population was 11 as of 2013. There is 1 street.

Geography 
Chupino is located 48 km ESE of Shipunovo (the district's administrative centre) by road. Ust-Porozikha is the nearest rural locality.

References 

Rural localities in Shipunovsky District